The 1991–92 Élite Ligue season was the 71st season of the Élite Ligue, the top level of ice hockey in France. Eight teams participated in the league, and the Dragons de Rouen won their second league title.

First round

Following the first round, Viry-Châtillon and Épinal played the remainder of their season in the Nationale 1 (second tier), where they joined 10 other teams for that league's final round.

Final round

External links
Season on hockeyarchives.info

France
1991–92 in French ice hockey
Ligue Magnus seasons